The Sue Kaufman Prize for First Fiction is awarded by the American Academy of Arts and Letters. The $5,000 prize is given for the best published first novel or collection of short stories in the preceding year. It was established in 1979 in memory of author Sue Kaufman.

Past winners
 1980 - Jayne Anne Phillips, Black Tickets
 1981 - Tom Lorenz, Guys Like Us 
 1982 - Ted Mooney, Easy Travel to Other Planets 
 1983 - Susanna Moore, My Old Sweetheart
 1984 - Denis Johnson, Angels
 1985 - Louise Erdrich, Love Medicine  
 1986 - Cecile Pineda, Face
 1987 - Jeannette Haien, The All of It
 1988 - Kaye Gibbons, Ellen Foster
 1989 - Gary Krist, The Garden State
 1990 - Allan Gurganus, Oldest Living Confederate Widow Tells All
 1991 - Charles Palliser, The Quincunx 
 1992 - Alex Ullmann, Afghanistan
 1993 - Francisco Goldman, The Long Night of White Chickens
 1994 - Emile Capouya, In the Sparrow Hills  
 1995 - Jim Grimsley, Winter Birds 
 1996 - Peter Landesman, The Raven 
 1997 - Brad Watson, Last Days of the Dog-Men
 1998 - Charles Frazier, Cold Mountain 
 1999 - Michael Byers, The Coast of Good Intentions
 2000 - Nathan Englander, For the Relief of Unbearable Urges<re></ref>
 2001 - Akhil Sharma, An Obedient Father 
 2002 - Don Lee, Yellow  
 2003 - Gabe Hudson, Dear Mr. President
 2004 - Nell Freudenberger, Lucky Girls  
 2005 - John Dalton, Heaven Lake  
 2006 - Uzodinma Iweala, Beasts of No Nation
 2007 - Tony D'Souza, Whiteman  
 2008 - Frances Hwang, Transparency
 2009 - Charles Bock, Beautiful Children
 2010 - Josh Weil, The New Valley
 2011 - Brando Skyhorse, The Madonnas of Echo Park
 2012 - Ismet Prcic, Shards
 2013 - Kevin Powers, The Yellow Birds
 2014 - Manuel Gonzales, The Miniature Wife
 2015 - Michael Carroll, Little Reef and Other Stories
 2016 - Kirstin Valdez Quade, Night at the Fiestas
 2017 - Lee Clay Johnson, Nitro Mountain
 2018 - Emily Fridlund, History of Wolves
 2019 - Jane Delury, The Balcony
 2020 - Isabella Hammad, The Parisian
 2021 - Douglas Stuart, Shuggie Bain
 2022 - Jackie Polzin, Brood
 2023 - Morgan Talty, Night of the Living Rez

References

External links
Sue Kaufman Prize for First Fiction

American literary awards
Awards established in 1979
Awards of the American Academy of Arts and Letters
First book awards